Nepalese Americans are citizens or permanent residents of the United States of America who trace their family descent to Nepal. This article is a list of notable Nepalese Americans.

Prominent Academia and educationists
 Parag Pathak, Professor of Economics at the Massachusetts Institute of Technology
 Deepak Shimkhada, Adjunct professor at Chaffey College in Rancho Cucamonga, California
 Ram I. Mahato, Professor of the Department of Pharmaceutical Sciences, University of Nebraska Medical Center, Omaha, United States.

Entertainment and media
 Daya Vaidya, Actress
 Prabal Gurung, Fashion designer
 Curtis Waters, Canadian-American Musician
 Arthur Gunn, Singer, American Idol (season 18) Runner-up, 2020
 Kiran Gajmer, Singer Voice of Nepal Winner, 2021
 Manita Devkota, Model
 Sujita Basnet, Model
 Sajjan Raj Vaidya, Singer
 Bartika Eam Rai, Singer
 Kiran Chetry, News anchor

Literature and art
 Gautama V. Vajracharya, Sanskritist
 Samrat Upadhyay, Author
 Pratyoush Onta, Historian

Science and technology
 Lujendra Ojha, Planetary scientist in NASA
 Bhaskar Thapa, Tunnel engineering expert
 Yadav Pandit, Nuclear physics scientist
 Bodhraj Acharya, Molecular Biology expert

Politics
 Harry Bhandari, First Nepalese-American male state Legislator

Sports
 Kanishka Chaugai, American domestic cricketer 
 Prithu Baskota, Cricketer
 Basanta Regmi, Cricketer
 Pradip Humagain, Soccer Manager

References

Lists of American people of Asian descent

Lists of American people by ethnic or national origin
Lists of people by ethnicity